The New Zealand Under 17's football team, more commonly known as the Young All Whites, is controlled by New Zealand Football and represents New Zealand in international Under 17 or youth football competitions.

New Zealand was the host nation for the 1999 FIFA U-17 World Championship.

Competition record

OFC U-17 Championship
The OFC Under 17 Qualifying Tournament is a tournament held once every two years to decide the only two qualification spots for the Oceania Football Confederation (OFC) and its representatives at the FIFA U-17 World Cup. Since 2018 it has been renamed as the OFC U-16 Championship and held in the year preceding the U-17 World Cup.

FIFA U-17 World Cup

1997 FIFA U-17 World Championship

1999 FIFA U-17 World Championship

2007 FIFA U-17 World Cup

2009 FIFA U-17 World Cup

2011 FIFA U-17 World Cup

2013 FIFA U-17 World Cup

2015 FIFA U-17 World Cup

2017 FIFA U-17 World Cup

2019 FIFA U-17 World Cup

Current squad
The following players were called up to the 2023 OFC U-17 Championship held in Fiji.

References

External links
Under-17 Historical results

under-17
Oceanian national under-17 association football teams